This is the list of basketball clubs operating in Estonia. The list is incomplete.

Unsorted
 Audentese Spordiklubi (for women)
 BIG/new balance Rapla
 Ehitustööriist/TTÜ
 EKE Projekt
 EMÜ basketball team
 Fausto BC (BC Fausto)
 G4S Noorteliiga (for women)
 Harju KEK
 Kalev/Rapla BC (BC Kalev/Rapla)
 Keskrajooni SK
 Kuremaa SK
 Kuressaare SK
 Rakvere KK (KK Rakvere)
 Rakvere Palliklubi (Rakvere PK)
 Taba 89 KK (KK Taba 89)
 Tallinna Kalev (1991–2005) (Tallinna Kalev (basketball club))
 Tallinna Metallist
 Tallinna NMKÜ
 Tallinna Russ
 Tallinna Standard
 Tallinna Ülikool KK (KK Tallinna Ülikool (for women))
 Tallinna Võitleja
 Tartu Fausto BC (BC Tartu Fausto)
 Tartu KK
 Tartu Maja
 Tartu NMKÜ
 Tartu Ülikool/Kalev (for women)
 Tarvas RSK (RSK Tarvas)
 TPÜ/Kiili
 Viimsi KK (KK Viimsi)
 Võru KK

References 

 
Estonia
Basketball
Lists of organizations based in Estonia